Potter Nunataks is a group of small, rather isolated nunataks about 6 nautical miles (11 km) southwest of the Helliwell Hills and 20 nautical miles (37 km) northeast of Welcome Mountain of the Outback Nunataks. Mapped by United States Geological Survey (USGS) from surveys and U.S. Navy air photos, 1959–64. Named by Advisory Committee on Antarctic Names (US-ACAN) for Neal Potter, economist, McMurdo Station, 1965–66, who made a study of the economic potentials of Antarctica.

Nunataks of Victoria Land
Pennell Coast